The Secret Lover (Italian: L'amante segreta) is a 1941 Italian drama film directed by Carmine Gallone and starring Alida Valli, Fosco Giachetti and Vivi Gioi. It was made at Cinecittà in Rome.

Plot
After her tutor embezzles and squanders her inheritance, a young woman is forced to seek work in a series of different occupations.

Cast
 Alida Valli as Renata Croci  
 Fosco Giachetti as Giorgio Amholt  
 Vivi Gioi as Diana Ponzio  
 Osvaldo Valenti as Valentini 
 Luigi Almirante as Il pittore Riganti  
 Camillo Pilotto as Giacomo Mori 
 Ada Dondini as Antonia Mori  
 Bella Starace Sainati as La contessa Bianca Lotti 
 Anita Farra as Teresa Amholt  
 Luigi Pavese as Melchiorri  
 Carlo Lombardi as L'attore Mario Fulvi  
 Arturo Bragaglia as Il ragionere  
 Jacchi Gambino as Krick  
 Claudio Ermelli as Il cameriere Ottaviano  
 Giuseppe Pierozzi as Marini 
 Luigi Erminio D'Olivo as Il barone  
 Marina Doge as Un'amica di Renata  
 Fedele Gentile as Un amico di Renata  
 Mario Giannini as Un amico di Renata  
 Mara Landi as Un'amica di Renata  
 Alfredo Martinelli as Un cliente dell'albergo  
 Edda Soligo as La cameriera dell'albergo  
 Alfredo Varelli as Un amico di Renata 
 Giuseppe Varni as Il portiere dell'albergo

References

Bibliography 
 Gundle, Stephen. Mussolini's Dream Factory: Film Stardom in Fascist Italy. Berghahn Books, 2013.
 Nowell-Smith, Geoffrey & Hay, James & Volpi, Gianni. The Companion to Italian Cinema. Cassell, 1996.

External links 
 

1941 films
Italian drama films
1941 drama films
1940s Italian-language films
Films directed by Carmine Gallone
Films shot at Cinecittà Studios
Italian black-and-white films
1940s Italian films